NBC Columbia can refer to:

KOMU-TV, the NBC television affiliate in Columbia, Missouri.
WIS (TV), the NBC television affiliate in Columbia, South Carolina.